Crodino is a non-alcoholic bitter aperitif, produced since 1964. Since 1995 it is part of Gruppo Campari. It is an orange colored drink made of herbal extracts and sugar, and it is sold in 10 cl (6 oz) bottles. It is primarily consumed in Italy and other European countries.

Name
The name Crodino derives from a comune in the province of Verbano-Cusio-Ossola, Crodo, Italy, where it has been bottled since 1964.

Cocktails 
It is used to make sixteen rum, a cocktail of Piedmont.

References

External links 

 Official website

Non-alcoholic drinks
Campari Group
Italian drinks